Bela Bach (born 30 September 1990) is a German politician of the Social Democratic Party (SPD) who served as a member of the Bundestag from the state of Bavaria from 2020 until 2021.

Early life and education
Born in Magdeburg, Saxony-Anhalt, Bach completed her Abitur in 2010 and subsequently studied law at the Ludwig Maximilian University of Munich until 2018.

Political career
Bach has been a member of the SPD since 2007. On 4 February 2020 she succeeded Martin Burkert in the Bundestag. In parliament, she was a member of the Committee on Transport and Digital Infrastructure and the Committee on Petitions.

In addition to her committee assignments, Bach was a substitute member of the German delegation to the Parliamentary Assembly of the Council of Europe (PACE) from 2020 until 2021, where she served on the Committee on Legal Affairs and Human Rights.

In March 2021, Bach announced that she would not stand in the 2021 federal elections.

Other activities
 Federal Network Agency for Electricity, Gas, Telecommunications, Posts and Railway (BNetzA), Member of the Rail Infrastructure Advisory Council (since 2020)
 German United Services Trade Union (ver.di), Member

References

External links 

 Bundestag biography 

1990 births
Living people
Members of the Bundestag for Bavaria
Female members of the Bundestag
21st-century German women politicians
Members of the Bundestag 2017–2021
Members of the Bundestag for the Social Democratic Party of Germany
Ludwig Maximilian University of Munich alumni
Politicians from Magdeburg